Know Labs, Inc is a US-based medical device company that creates non-invasive health monitoring systems for glucose in addition to sensor technology using radio-microwave spectroscopy to identify and measure molecules in vivo. Know Labs is a public company whose shares trade under the stock symbol KNW.

History
Visualant was founded in 1998 by  Ron Erickson. The technology was originally developed by Tom Furness and Brian Showengerdt over a period of seven years at Furness's private research lab 'RATLab'.

Visualant acquired TransTech Systems of Aurora, Oregon in 2010. TransTech distributes security products and systems to security and law enforcement industries.

In May 2012, Visualant entered into a joint development contract, and licensing agreement with Sumitomo Precision Products Co., Ltd. focusing on the commercialization of the SPM technology. The following year, the United States Patent and Trademark Office granted its sixth Visualant a patent titled "Method, apparatus, and article to facilitate distributed evaluation of objects using electromagnetic energy." Later in 2013, Visualant partnered with Intellectual Ventures to further the development of intellectual property through Intellectual Venture's 'Inventor Network'.

In 2018, Visualant, Incorporated announced a name change to Know Labs, Inc.

Awards and recognition
In February 2013, Visualant won the Green Photonics category of the 2013 Prism Awards for Photonics Innovation for its ChromaID technology.

References

Companies based in Seattle
Companies established in 1988
Technology companies of the United States